Sandringham is a suburb of Auckland, New Zealand. It is a multi-ethnic suburb with a population of over 12,000.

Sandringham Village is a walk of a few hundred metres south along Sandringham Rd from the Outer Link bus route, and has a strong South Asian influence in restaurants and small supermarkets, Halal butchers and Bollywood movies. Nearby are Mt Eden, Kingsland, and Chinese-influenced Balmoral. The village has a post office, pharmacy, medical and legal practices, a real estate agency and a community centre.

The village architecture is art deco influenced, and most has survived, except the original village cinema.  The surrounding streets are wooden villas and bungalows from the 1920s and 1930s.

The volcanic cone of Owairaka (Mt Albert) forms Sandringham’s view to the west, and the Roy Clements Treeway on Meola Creek leads from nearby Ferguson Avenue to Rocket Park and the Mt Albert Community Centre.

Sandringham was named after the country house of Edward, Prince of Wales in Norfolk, England, still used by the present royal family.

The main road is Sandringham Road which runs more or less north-south. At the northern end, Kingsland is located near the Eden Park stadium. Sandringham Village is located at the southern end of Sandringham Road just before it connects with Mount Albert Road. The top New Zealand football club Central United play at the Kiwitea Street Stadium in Sandringham. SPiCE (Sandringham Project in Community Empowerment) is an active community-led development organisation set up by local residents in 2013 that runs activities, events and projects in and around Sandringham. The local secondary schools are Mount Albert Grammar School, Marist College and St Peter's College.

History

The Sandringham suburb began as a small farming settlement known as Cabbage Tree Swamp, named for the prevalence of cordyline australis and the area's predisposition to flooding. The first European settlers in the area were mainly engaged in dairy farming or market gardening. By 1862, there were sixteen properties along what was then Cabbage Tree Swamp Road. In 1877, Cabbage Tree Swamp residents successfully lobbied to have the road's name changed to Kingsland Road. The road and suburb were renamed again as Edendale in 1916, and finally as Sandringham in 1929.

Through the nineteenth and early twentieth century, the suburb grew slowly and remained mostly farmland and scrub. There was no water supply in the district by 1900 and by 1924 the area was still without gas or electricity. Flooding was a major problem in the area. Eden Park and Gribblehirst Park became lakes during heavy winter rain, as did the reserve land east of the Sandringham shops. After a heavy storm in 1919, locals recalled boating through the streets and floodwaters "flowing through the bay windows" of one low-lying house. Substantial development only came around 1925 with the construction of the tramline, resulting in the core of what is now Sandringham Village being built. Rows of evenly spaced streets spread on each side of Sandringham Road and were lined with wooden California-style bungalows. Large parts of the area remained undeveloped however, and services such as telephone, electricity and gas were only provided at a minimum level.

Over the following decades more retail buildings were constructed in Sandringham Village. Around 1927, the Mayfair Cinema was built, an elegant building in the Neo-Greek style; it was demolished in the early 1990s. The Sandringham Service Station, still operating in 2011, was first erected by Sydney Waring in 1929. The first Indian restaurant, Stan's Halal Hotpot was opened in 2001 followed by Satya's in 2006. An increasing number of South Asian restaurants have opened in Sandringham village which has led to it often being referred to as Auckland's "Little India".

After the Second World War, what little remained of the farmland was developed as state housing. Sandringham Village is a virtually intact example of an interwar suburban shopping precinct.

As part of the Eden electorate, Sandringham became a no-licence area from 1909 until 2000, meaning that alcohol could not be sold. As a result, there were no public houses in Sandringham until the opening of Prague Bar 2011 (now closed) which was followed by the opening of Lord Kitchener Pub in 2016 . Earlier plans to build a tavern at 597 Sandringham Road were successfully opposed by residents in 2001.

Local Government
Sandringham falls within the Mt Albert constituency for the national Parliament.  In terms of local government, Sandringham comes under the Albert-Eden Local Board,  of Auckland Council. The Albert-Eden Local Board includes the suburbs of Waterview, Point Chevalier, Sandringham, Mount Albert, Morningside, Owairaka, Balmoral, Kingsland, Mount Eden, Epsom and Greenlane.

Transportation
Public transportation extended from the city centre to the surrounding areas in the late 1870s, with horse-drawn buses being the first mode of regular public transportation.   At the beginning of the 20th century, trams began connecting areas such as Mt Eden, Balmoral, Kingsland, and Mt Albert with the city, which enabled the suburban development of those areas. The Auckland trams ran for the last time in the 1950s.

Demographics

Sandringham had a population of 12,060 at the 2018 New Zealand census, an increase of 822 people (7.3%) since the 2013 census, and an increase of 1,149 people (10.5%) since the 2006 census. There were 3,981 households, comprising 6,054 males and 6,006 females, giving a sex ratio of 1.01 males per female, with 2,244 people (18.6%) aged under 15 years, 3,039 (25.2%) aged 15 to 29, 5,766 (47.8%) aged 30 to 64, and 1,011 (8.4%) aged 65 or older.

Ethnicities were 53.2% European/Pākehā, 7.0% Māori, 10.2% Pacific peoples, 36.6% Asian, and 3.4% other ethnicities. People may identify with more than one ethnicity.

The percentage of people born overseas was 44.7, compared with 27.1% nationally.

Although some people chose not to answer the census's question about religious affiliation, 45.2% had no religion, 28.1% were Christian, 0.2% had Māori religious beliefs, 14.0% were Hindu, 3.5% were Muslim, 1.7% were Buddhist and 3.1% had other religions.

Of those at least 15 years old, 4,119 (42.0%) people had a bachelor's or higher degree, and 807 (8.2%) people had no formal qualifications. 2,319 people (23.6%) earned over $70,000 compared to 17.2% nationally. The employment status of those at least 15 was that 5,553 (56.6%) people were employed full-time, 1,449 (14.8%) were part-time, and 387 (3.9%) were unemployed.

Education

Landmarks
Waring Shops - This block of narrow shops was constructed in 1923 and takes its name from the local grocer at the time. The shop has maintained its look, with the same white painted exterior it has always had. It is now a T-shirt shop and electrician's office.
Sandringham Community Centre - the community centre is an important gathering place, with an expanding range of classes and bookings for personal and community events. Two community playgroups meet in facilities behind the community centre : a Muslim group Tuesdays and Thursday mornings, and the general community group Monday, Wednesday and Friday mornings.

Education
Edendale Primary School is on Sandringham Road, and Good Shepherd, Balmoral School and Maungawhau Primary are slightly further. Te Kura Kaupapa Maori o Nga Maungarongo, where the New Zealand School curriculum is taught in the Maori language, is on Haverstock Road. Local intermediates include Balmoral School, Kōwhai Intermediate School and Wesley Intermediate. The local secondary schools are Mount Albert Grammar School, Marist College and St Peter's College.

Sports
Sandringham is home to Eden Rugby Football Club and the Mt Albert Ramblers softball club. Edendale Reserve has a playing field for amateur sport.

Association football
Sandringham is home to the New Zealand association football club Central United who compete in the Lotto Sport Italia NRFL Premier.

Transport
Sandringham is well served by south bound buses, and is only 7 km from the Auckland CBD. The centre of all the shopping and business activities in Sandringham village is along Sandringham Road, roughly between Halesowen Avenue and Lambeth Road. By vehicle Sandringham can be accessed from the Northwestern Motorway (SH16) via St Lukes Road.

References

External links
 Sandringham Village
 Sandringham Community Centre
SPiCE (Sandringham Project in Community Empowerment)
 Mount Albert Grammar School
 Marist College
 St Peters College
 Edendale Primary School
 Central United Football Club
 Eden Rugby Football Club
 Mt Albert Ramblers
 Photographs of Sandringham held in Auckland Libraries' heritage collections.

Suburbs of Auckland